Coode Street Jetty is located in South Perth in Western Australia. The jetty is on the southern shore of the Swan River in the section known as Perth Water.

History
An earlier jetty existed, also with an adjacent pool, before the construction of a newer jetty along the altered shore-line.

Coode Street Jetty was served by Transperth services from Barrack Street and occasionally via Mends Street until services ceased on 30 April 2005 due to lack of patronage.

It is included in potential stopping places by the 2016-commencing Little Ferry Company.

References

Jetties in Perth, Western Australia
South Perth, Western Australia